A Thousand to One is a 1920 American silent drama film directed by Rowland V. Lee and starring Hobart Bosworth, Ethel Grey Terry and Charles West.

Plot
The story follows William Newlands, a man deep in debt who marries wealthy Beatrice on the advice of his unscrupulous friend, Jimmy Munroe. On their honeymoon train, they experience a derailment where Beatrice saves the life of mine owner Steven Crawford, but loses sight of her husband who is presumed dead.

In reality, Newlands has survived the wreck and is filled with remorse for his past actions. He disguises himself with a beard and finds work at Crawford's mine, eventually becoming the foreman. During his time there, he brings law and order to the miners and discovers a rich vein of ore, saving Crawford from financial ruin.

Despite his success, Newlands avoids Beatrice as he has decided to stay out of her life. However, Beatrice recognizes him and begs for a second chance at their marriage. Newlands ultimately agrees and the story ends with the couple reconciling.

Cast
 Hobart Bosworth as William Newlands 
 Ethel Grey Terry as Beatrice Crittenden 
 Charles West as Jimmy Munroe 
 Landers Stevens as Steven Crawford 
 J. Gordon Russell as Georgeson 
 Fred Kohler as Donnelly

References

Bibliography
 Taves, Brian. Thomas Ince: Hollywood's Independent Pioneer. University Press of Kentucky, 2012.

External links

 

1920 films
1920 drama films
1920s English-language films
American silent feature films
Silent American drama films
American black-and-white films
Films directed by Rowland V. Lee
Films with screenplays by Joseph F. Poland
1920s American films